Olson Nunatak is a bare rock nunatak lying at the south side of the terminus of Reeves Glacier, 4 nautical miles (7 km) north of the summit of Mount Gerlache, in Victoria Land. Mapped by United States Geological Survey (USGS) from surveys and U.S. Navy air photos, 1955–63. Named by Advisory Committee on Antarctic Names (US-ACAN) for James J. Olson, geophysicist with the United States Antarctic Research Program (USARP) Ross Ice Shelf party in the 1961–62 season.

Nunataks of Antarctica
Scott Coast